500D may refer to:

 Canon EOS 500D - a camera
 MD Helicopters MD 500 - aka Hughes 500D
 MD 500 Defender - a military version